The Paris Rockets were a Class-B minor league baseball team that played in the Big State League in 1948. The team, managed by Homer Peel, was based in Paris, Texas and featured future and/or former Major League Baseball players Red Borom, Frank Carswell, Merv Connors, Tex Shirley, Dave Short, Jim Walkup and Barney White. The team finished with a win-loss record of 62-85, placing 6th in the league, in its only year of existence under that nickname.

See also
Paris Red Peppers

References

Defunct minor league baseball teams
Baseball teams established in 1948
1948 establishments in Texas
1948 disestablishments in Texas
Professional baseball teams in Texas
Defunct baseball teams in Texas
Paris, Texas
Baseball teams disestablished in 1948